The 1996 Norwegian Football Cup was the 91st edition of the Norwegian Football Cup. The 1996 Norwegian Football Cup was won by Tromsø after they defeated Bodø/Glimt in the cup final  with the score 2–1. This was the first time two teams from Northern Norway had met in the final.

Calendar
Below are the dates for each round as given by the official schedule:

First round 

|colspan="3" style="background-color:#97DEFF"|21 May 1996

|-
|colspan="3" style="background-color:#97DEFF"|22 May 1996

|-
|colspan="3" style="background-color:#97DEFF"|23 May 1996

|-
|colspan="3" style="background-color:#97DEFF"|24 May 1996

|}

Second round 

|colspan="3" style="background-color:#97DEFF"|12 June 1996

|}

Third round 

|colspan="3" style="background-color:#97DEFF"|26 June 1996

|-
|colspan="3" style="background-color:#97DEFF"|27 June 1996

|}

Fourth round

|colspan="3" style="background-color:#97DEFF"|17 July 1996
{{OneLegResult|Bodø/Glimt'||3–2|Brann}}

|}

Quarter-finals

Semi-finals
 First leg 

 Second leg Bodø/Glimt won 7–1 on aggregate.Tromsø won 3–0 on aggregate.''

Final

References
http://www.rsssf.no

Norwegian Football Cup seasons
Norway
Football Cup